Castleford may refer to:
Castleford, a town in West Yorkshire, England
Castleford Tigers, a rugby league club
Castleford High School Technology and Sports College, a high school
Castleford railway station
Castleford, Idaho, in the United States
Castleford, Ontario, Canada, a community in Horton Township
Castleford: Horse briefly mentioned in Lord of the Rings: The Two Towers (Movie)